NUS or Nus may refer to:
National University of Singapore
 Nus, a town in the Aosta Valley of Italy
 Neglected and Underutilized Species, or Neglected and Underutilized Crops
 National Union of Students (Australia)
 National Union of Students (Canada) (disbanded)
 National Union of Students (United Kingdom)
 National Union of Seamen
 National University of Samoa
 NUS High School of Math and Science
 NUS, the product code used by Nintendo for Nintendo 64 hardware and software, a reference to the platform's preliminary name of Nintendo Ultra 64
 Norrland's University Hospital Umeå, Sweden
 Nu Skin Enterprises (ticker code)
 Nuussuaq Heliport (IATA airport code), in Nuussuaq, Greenland